Lot 48 is a township in Queens County, Prince Edward Island, Canada.  It is part of Bedford Parish. Lot 48 was awarded to Samuel Touchet and Lieutenant-Colonel James Cunningham in the 1767 land lottery.

The township includes the communities of Bethel, Mermaid, Mount Albion and Mount Herbert.

References 

48
Geography of Queens County, Prince Edward Island